Barbitistes obtusus, common name Southern Saw-tailed Bush-cricket or Alpine Saw Bush-cricket, is a species of bush crickets in the subfamily Phaneropterinae.

Distribution and habitat
This species replaces Barbitistes serricauda in the Southern Alps. It is present in France, Italy and Switzerland, from the Basses-Alpes to the Julian Alps and central Apennines, with a small populations in the Apuan Alps. This typical mountain species prefers lightly shaded woods and scrubland up to 2000 meters a.s.l.. It is often found on blackberry leaves.

Description
This species is very similar to Barbitistes serricauda, so that both species are difficult to distinguish from each other. 

The ground color varies greatly from gray and light brown to olive green and turquoise. Dark individuals are rare. The head  is reddish. The  reddish to dark antennae are about a body length and show a small bright ring at regular intervals. Two yellow stripes with red border extend from the eyes on pronotum and tegmina. The abdomen is short and thick, while the pronotum and head are quite small. The abdomen has tiny dark spots. The reddish legs are of medium length and wear small spines. The sharply formed wings are reddish brown and laterally yellow lined. In the female the wings are shorter and they may be greenish, yellowish or reddish brown. The cerci of the male are dark red-brown, clearly S-shaped, with rounded apex. They are the most important distinction between this species and Barbitistes serricauda.

Biology
Adults can be found from June to August feeding on plants and small invertebrates.  About egg  laying and development little is known. The singing of this species consists of short sounds generated 3-10 times per minute depending on the temperature.

Bibliography
 Fontana & Buzzetti (2004) Biogeographical considerations on some Mediterranean Phaneropteridae and description of a new genus and a new species from South Africa (Orthoptera), Memorie della Società Entomologica Italiana (Mem. Soc. Entomol. Ital.) 82(2):441-468
 Defaut [Ed.] (2001), La détermination des Orthoptères de France, Defaut, Bedeilhac 85
 Defaut (1999) Synopsis des orthoptères de France, Matériaux Orthoptériques et Entomocenotiques 2:87
 Voisin [Ed.] (2003) Atlas des Orthoptères et des Mantides de France, Patrimoines Naturels 60:1-104
 Fontana, Buzzetti, Cogo & Odé (2002), Guida al riconoscimento e allo studio di cavallette, grilli, mantidi e insetti affini del Veneto: Blattaria, Mantodea, Isoptera, Orthoptera, Phasmatodea, Dermaptera, Embidiina, Museo Naturalistico Archaeologico di Vicenza, Vicenza 1-592
 Bellmann & Luquet (1995), Guide des sauterelles, grillons et criquets d'Europe occidentale, Delachaux et Niestle, Lausanne 1-383
 Jacobson & V.L. Bianchi (1905), Orthopteroid and Pseudoneuropteroid Insects of Russian Empire and adjacent countries, Devrien Publ. (In Russian), St. Petersburg
 Baur, H. & Coray (2004) A revision of the Blattodea, Ensifera and Caelifera described by H. Fruhstorfer, Revue Suisse de Zoologie (Revue Suisse de Zool.) 111(3):611-630
 Nadig (1987) Saltatoria (Insecta) of the southern and southeastern slopes of the Alps. Part I. Tettigoniidae, Revue Suisse de Zoologie (Revue Suisse de Zool.) 94(2):257-356
 Baur, H. & Coray (2004) The status of Barbitistes serricauda (Fabricius, 1794) (Ensifera: Phaneropteridae) - a re-assessment, Revue Suisse de Zoologie (Revue Suisse de Zool.) 111(4):921-924

References

 Fauna Europaea

External links
 Sound recordings of Barbitistes obtusus on BioAcoustica

Orthoptera of Europe
Insects described in 1881
Phaneropterinae